The 2023 European Motocross Championship is the 35th European Motocross Championship season since it was revived in 1988. It includes 14 events and 6 different classes. It will start in a yet to be announced location on 8 April, and will end in Great Britain on 15 October. All rounds will act as support classes at the European rounds of the 2023 MXGP.

EMX250
A 10-round calendar for the 2023 season was announced on 10 November 2022.
EMX250 is for riders competing on 2-stroke and 4-stroke motorcycles between 175cc-250cc.
Only riders under the age of 21 are allowed to compete.

Calendar

Entry list

EMX125
A 10-round calendar for the 2023 season was announced on 10 November 2022.
EMX125 is for riders competing on 2-stroke motorcycles of 125cc.

Calendar

Entry list

EMXOpen
A 1-round calendar for the 2023 season was announced on 10 November 2022.
EMXOpen is for riders competing on 2-stroke and 4-stroke motorcycles up to 450cc.

Calendar

EMX2T
A 1-round calendar for the 2023 season was announced on 10 November 2022.
EMX2T is for riders competing on 2-stroke motorcycles of 250cc.

Calendar

EMX85
A 1-round calendar for the 2023 season was announced on 10 November 2022.
EMX85 is for riders competing on 2-stroke motorcycles of 85cc.

Calendar

EMX65
A 1-round calendar for the 2023 season was announced on 10 November 2022.
EMX65 is for riders competing on 2-stroke motorcycles of 65cc.

Calendar

References

External links
 

European Motocross
European Motocross
European Motocross Championship